The Nihon Ukulele Association is a Japanese association for ukulele players.  It was founded in 1959 by Yukihiko Haida, a Hawaiian-born nisei who moved to Japan at a young age.

With his brother, Katsuhiko Haida, Haida formed the Moana Glee Club in 1929, but anti-Western sentiments from Japanese authority ended that association.  Following World War II, Haida met Herb Ohta, an American Marine stationed in Japan, and a serious ukulele player.  This discovery affirmed Haida's interest in the ukulele, and influenced him to form the Association.

Sources
Jim Beloff. The Ukulele: A Visual History Backbeat Books, 2003.

External links 
 

String instrument organizations
Ukulele players
Cultural organizations based in Japan
1959 establishments in Japan
Music organizations based in Japan